The I.O.O.F. Hall, in Garnavillo, Iowa, also known as Garnavillo Lodge Hall, is a two-story building built in 1860.  It served as a clubhouse for International Order of Odd Fellows and then later for Masons.

It was listed on the National Register of Historic Places in 1979.

In 1979 it was assessed to be historically significant as a "very nice example" of Greek Revival architecture, which is relatively rare in Iowa, and as a "very early" fraternal hall that was well-preserved.

References

Cultural infrastructure completed in 1860
Buildings and structures in Clayton County, Iowa
Greek Revival architecture in Iowa
Odd Fellows buildings in Iowa
National Register of Historic Places in Clayton County, Iowa
Clubhouses on the National Register of Historic Places in Iowa